Stathis Chaitas (born 20 March 1940) is a retired Greek footballer who played as a midfielder during the 1960s and '70s. He was named the 1969 Greek Athlete of the Year.

Career

Club career
Born in Istiaia, Euboea, Chaitas played football for Panionios from 1958 until 1977 with a brief interlude in 1974–1975 season when he played for AEL. He still holds the record of most appearances in the 1st National for Panionios with 460 caps.

International career
Chaitas appeared in 24 matches for the senior Greece national football team from 1964 to 1971, scoring one goal.

Career as manager
After his playing days were over, he coached a number of clubs including Panionios, late in 1996.

References

External links

1940 births
Living people
Greek footballers
Greece international footballers
Athlitiki Enosi Larissa F.C. players
Panionios F.C. players
Association football midfielders
People from Euboea (regional unit)
Greek football managers
Panionios F.C. managers

Footballers from Central Greece